Radio Kostajnica is a local Bosnian radio station, broadcasting from Kostajnica, Bosnia and Herzegovina. It was launched in 1995 by JP Radio Kostajnica. The radio station broadcasts a variety of programs such as music, local news and talk shows.

The program is mainly produced in Serbian, from 08:00 to 16:00h. The estimated number of listeners of Radio Kostajnica is around 10,361. The radiostation is also available in the municipalities of Bosanska Krajina and in neighboring Croatia.

Frequencies
 Kostajnica/Bosanska Kostajnica

See also 
List of radio stations in Bosnia and Herzegovina

References

External links 
 www.fmscan.org
 www.radiokostajnica.com
 Communications Regulatory Agency of Bosnia and Herzegovina

Kostajnica
Radio stations established in 1995